Alireza Afshar is an Iranian military officer. He served as the political deputy to the Minister of Interior, being appointed in August 2007. In this capacity, he served as head of Country's Election Headquarters during 2008 Iranian legislative election.

He was formerly spokesman of Iranian Armed Forces.

He was a member of the Mojahedin of the Islamic Revolution Organization in the 1980s, and belonged to its right-wing faction.

References

Living people
Iranian Vice Ministers
Mojahedin of the Islamic Revolution Organization politicians
Islamic Revolutionary Guard Corps brigadier generals
Year of birth uncertain
Islamic Revolutionary Guard Corps personnel of the Iran–Iraq War
1951 births
Sharif University of Technology alumni
Iranian mechanical engineers
People from Mashhad